Lysidine is a derivative of 2-imidazoline.  It is a colorless solid with basic properties and soluble in organic solvents.  It is used as a precursor to other compounds of pharmaceutical interest.

Synthesis and reactions
It is prepared by condensing ethylenediamine with acetic acid to give the diamide, which undergoes CaO-induced cyclization. Alternatively, it arises from the condensation of glyoxal, acetaldehyde, and ammonia.

Lysidine is an intermediate in the synthesis of the drug metronidazole.  In the presence of Raney nickel, it undergoes dehydrogenation to 2-methylimidazole, which can then be further elaborated.

References

Amidines
Imidazolines